Andrey Milewski (born 9 January 1977) is a Belarusian former professional footballer.

Career
Born in Mazyr, Milewski played professionally in the Belarusian Premier League with FC Shakhtyor Soligorsk, FC Dinamo Minsk, FC Darida Minsk Raion and FC Minsk.

Milewski made seven appearances for the Belarus national football team from 2000 to 2003.

Honours
Dinamo Minsk
Belarusian Premier League champion: 2004
Belarusian Cup winner: 2002–03

References

1977 births
Living people
Belarusian footballers
Belarusian expatriate footballers
Expatriate footballers in Azerbaijan
Expatriate footballers in Lithuania
Belarus international footballers
FC Torpedo-BelAZ Zhodino players
FC Shakhtyor Soligorsk players
FC Dinamo Minsk players
FC Darida Minsk Raion players
Shamakhi FK players
FC Šiauliai players
FK Sūduva Marijampolė players
FC Minsk players
FC Gorodeya players
Association football defenders
People from Mazyr
Sportspeople from Gomel Region